XERV-TDT, virtual channel 9 (UHF digital channel 19), is a television station located in Reynosa, Tamaulipas, whose over-the-air signal also covers the Rio Grande Valley across the international border in the United States. The station is owned by Grupo Televisa, carrying its Las Estrellas network.

The station broadcasts local programming and news centered on the Rio Grande Valley instead of Reynosa and Matamoros. Local programming included selected games (mainly Saturday games) of the Rio Grande Valley Killer Bees ice hockey team. The games are announced in English, while the commercials during the game are in Spanish. XERV also share a sales office with XHAB-TDT in McAllen, Texas, for sales of commercial time from American businesses. The station was launched in 1978.

Digital television

References

External links
Canal de las Estrellas 

Las Estrellas transmitters
Television stations in Reynosa
Television stations in the Lower Rio Grande Valley